Karl-Peter Schmidtke (born 16 December 1945) is a German sprinter. He competed in the men's 100 metres at the 1968 Summer Olympics representing West Germany.

References

1945 births
Living people
Athletes (track and field) at the 1968 Summer Olympics
German male sprinters
Olympic athletes of West Germany
People from Ludwigslust-Parchim